Henry Sulley (1845–1940) was an English architect and writer on the temples of Jerusalem.

Sulley was born to English parents in Brooklyn, Long Island, USA, 30 January 1845, but relocated back to Nottingham when still young.

As an architect, Sulley is noted for several buildings in Nottingham, among them 2 Hamilton Road, 'a fine Victorian dwelling' designed for James White the lace manufacturer in 1883.

Although he had no formal training in archaeology, Sulley's background in architecture allowed him to develop various ideas about Solomon's Temple and the City of David. His primary area of activity was in writing concerning the temples in Jerusalem: Solomon's Temple, Herod's Temple and Ezekiel's Temple. In 1929 Sulley was the first to propose that the watercourse of Siloam tunnel was following a natural crack,<ref>Zvi Abells, Asher Arbit The City of David water supply 1995 p15 "As long ago as 1929 an architect, Henry Sulley, wrote from England on page 124 of PEFQSt: "Since those who have inspected the tunnel mention a cleft in the rock at the point where the excavators met, it seems to me that this cleft is the explanation of the course taken by the excavators in forming this tunnel. Probably the cleft extended  from the Virgin's Fountain (Gihon Spring) to the Pool of Siloam, and a small quan- tity of water would at times trickle through"</ref> a theory developed by Ruth Amiran (1968), and Dan Gill (1994).

Sulley had been baptised as a Christadelphian in October 1871 at the age of 26 following lectures by Robert Roberts and reading Elpis Israel. When he was only 28 the bulk of the Nottingham Ecclesia left following Edward Turney into the Nazarene Fellowship for six years until Turney's death in 1879, after which most of those who had left returned.

As a Christadelphian Sulley toured Australia, New Zealand, America and Canada, showing his large illustrated architectural designs for Ezekiel's temple, in lecture halls and museums, typically over two or three nights. These public lectures followed a regular pattern: archaeology, architecture, prophecy, and then preaching. On his journeys he would write articles for publication in England giving impressions on the buildings he saw: for example, noting that the Washington Monument was a marvel, but that the corner-towers of Ezekiel's temple would be two-and-a-half times taller. During the period from 1898 onwards he was a regular assistant to the second editor of The Christadelphian, Charles Curwen Walker.

Buildings
Upnah House, 22 Balmoral Road, Nottingham 1873
Malvern House, 41 Mapperley Road, Nottingham 1874
2 Hamilton Road, Nottingham 1873
Oakfield, Cyprus Road, Mapperley Park, Nottingham 1882
Elmsleigh, Hamilton Road, Mapperley Park, Nottingham 1883
Addison Street Congregational Church 1884
Warehouse, Peachey Street, Nottingham 1887-88 (Now YMCA)

Publications

 Temple of Ezekiel's prophecy (1887)
 A Handbook to the Temple of Ezekiel's Prophecy Pentaletheia: Five writings on the Truth The Sign of the Coming of the Son of Man (1906)
 What is the Substance of Faith? A Reply to Sir Oliver Lodge (1908)
 Is It Armageddon? (1915; formerly Britain in prophecy)
 A House of Prayer for All People Where are our dead friends? Divine worship in the age to come Spiritlism''

References

1845 births
1940 deaths
Christadelphians
English Christians
Architects from Nottingham